Ali Fuat Cebesoy (September 23, 1882 – January 10, 1968) was an Ottoman and later Turkish army officer and politician.

Early life

Ali Fuat was born in September 1882 to father Ismail Fazil Pasha and mother Zekiye Hanım. He was of German-Circassian descent, and also his maternal grandfather Mehmet Ali Pasha was of Huguenot-French descent. Ali Fuat was the grandson (on his mother's side) of Mushir Mehmet Ali Pasha (Ludwig Karl Friedrich Detroit) who was the commander of the Danube Army (Tuna Şark Ordusu) during the Russo-Turkish war, participated in the Congress of Berlin as one of three representatives of the Ottoman Empire and was killed on September 7, 1878 in Gjakovë (Kosovo) by Albanian insurgents who were dissatisfied with the results of the Berlin Congress.

Military career

Ali Fuat attended the Military academy together with Kemal Atatürk, Kazım Karabekir, and Fethi Okyar amongst other notables of the Turkish War of Independence. Following he entered the War School in 1902, and graduated from the Ottoman War College in 1905 as a Staff Captain (Erkân-ı Harp Yüzbaşısı). Later he was assigned to the 3rd Rifle Battalion (Üçüncü Nişancı Taburu), the 28th Cavalry Regiment (Yirmi Sekizinci Süvari Alayı) based in Beirut under the command of Fifth Army based in Damascus, and later to 15th Artillery Regiment (On Beşinci Topçu Alayı) based in Thessalonica under the command of Third Army as an intern. He joined the Committee of Union and Progress (membership number was 191). On June 28, he was assigned to the staff officer of the Third Army. And then he was promoted to the rank of Senior Captain and appointed to the area commander of Karaferye (present day: Veria). On January 9, 1909, he was appointed to the military attaché in Rome, Italy. On October 1, 1911, he was appointed to the chief of the 1st department (chief of operations) of the Western Army. On February 20, he was temporarily appointed to the chief of staff of the I Corps, VII Corps. And then he was appointed to the commander of a detachment that was formed to liberate İpek (present day: Peć) and Yakova (present day: Đakovica) from Albanian insurgents.

Balkan Wars

On June 24, he was dispatched to Europe for the preparation of the transfer of arms and ammunition to Tripoli Vilayet. On September 29, he was appointed to the chief of staff of the İşkodra Corps. He also participated in the Balkan Wars. He became the chief of staff of the Yanya Corps and on November 10 he was appointed to the deputy commander of the 23rd Division (Yirmi Üçüncü Fırka), replacing Mirliva Djevad Pasha. On December 12, when the Greek offensive commanded by Konstantinos Sapountzakis was launched, he planned to retreat in an orderly fashion, but panic amongst the ranks led to the defeat of his division. In the defense line of Bizani he was severely wounded in the thigh, but continued to direct artillery fire whilst on a stretcher. On March 6, 1913, he and his forces surrendered following the instruction of Esad Pasha (Battle of Bizani). He was then transferred to a hospital in Kifissia, a suburb of Athens, to receive medical treatment.

World War
On January 15, 1914, he was appointed to the chief of staff of the VIII Corps. After Kress von Kressenstein was appointed the chief of staff of this corps, replacing Ali Fuat, he was promoted to the rank of Lieutenant Colonel (Kaymakam) and on September 19, he was appointed to the commander of the 25th Division. In January 1915, he participated in the First Suez Offensive. On January 7, he and his division left Birüssebi (present day: Beersheba) for the desert and arrived at the front of the Suez Canal, but the Ottoman forces couldn't pass the canal and retreated. He and his division went back to Gaza on January 20, 1915.

After the Gallipoli Campaign was launched, the 25th Division was dispatched to the Gallipoli Front on May 24, 1915, and started to arrive there on June 2, 1916. His division entered to the order of the XVII Corps of the First Army and deployed in the Bulair-Saros area.

On January 20, 1916, he was appointed to the commander of the 14th Division. At first, his division was intended for use in the Second Suez Offensive and sent to Maallaha, but because of the Russian offensive, his division instead came under the command of the Second Army under Ahmed Izzet Pasha, and on June 27, were sent back from the Rayak station to Aleppo and dispatched to Diyârbekir.

On September 30, he was promoted to commander of the 5th Division and in January he became the chief of staff of the Seconde Army.

On January 12, 1917, he returned to the Sina-Palestine Front and in April he became the deputy commander of the Sina-Palestine Front. On June 30, 1917, he became the commander of the XX Corps. After the Armistice of Mudros was signed, he concurrently became the deputy commander of Seventh Army, replacing Mustafa Kemal. After the Seventh Army was abolished, he transferred the headquarters of the XX Corps from Syria to Ereğli, then to Konya and to Ankara.

War of Independence
Ali Fuat Pasha organized the resistance in Western Turkey against the Greek invasion and thus actually started the National Independence War. He contributed to the resistance forces against the Greek army that had begun to occupy Western Anatolia. He signed Amasya Protocol and at the end of the Sivas Congress in 1920, he was appointed as the general commander of the National Forces by the Board of Representatives. The presence of him and his army in Ankara is the reason behind Atatürk's choice of this city as the center of Turkish War of Independence.

The same year, he was elected as a deputy at the First Parliament. He was appointed ambassador to Moscow, Soviet Russia in 1921, as he had quarrels with İsmet İnönü, who was appointed by Atatürk as the Commander of the Western Front although İnönü had failed against Greek invasion at Kutahya-Altıntas in 1921. By personally negotiating with Vladimir Lenin and Joseph Stalin in Moscow, he signed the Treaty of Moscow (1921), along the lines of the Brest-Litovsk Peace Treaty, as the representative of the Ankara government, which provided financial and military support from Russia to the Turkish Independence War, in exchange for ceding the right to Batum, then controlled by the Georgian Republic, to the Soviet government. After finishing his duty as an ambassador, he was elected as the second spokesman of the Grand National Assembly of Turkey.

Political life
After the declaration of the Republic, he became a deputy. In this new era of his political career, he joined the founders of the opposition party, the Progressive Republican Party, and he was elected as the general secretary of the party in 1924. During the rebellion of Shaikh Said, the Law on the Maintenance of Order was affected and the Progressive Republican Party was closed down. Ali Fuat Cebesoy was arrested with the accusations of participating in the attempt of assassination against Atatürk and was taken to İzmir. He was tried at the İzmir Independence Court and was acquitted in 1926.

He retired with the title of general. He stayed away from politics for four years between 1927 and 1931. In 1931, he returned to politics and was elected as a deputy representing Konya. He served as the deputy for Konya and Eskişehir until 1950. He also served as  Minister of Public Works from 1939 to 1943, Minister of Transportation (1943–1946) and as the president of the Parliament in 1948. He was an independent candidate of the Democratic Party from Eskişehir in the first democratic elections of the Turkish history held on May 14, 1950, and he was elected with a landslide. In the following years, he was elected as a deputy from İstanbul and served in the parliament for ten more years between 1950 and 1960. After the military coup on May 27, 1960, he was initially arrested by the junta with the rest of the Democratic Party MPs but later set free. After this experience he quit politics for good.

In accordance with his will, he was buried in the backyard of a mosque near Geyve train station, where the first shots of the Turkish War of Independence were fired, when he died at the age of 86. However, his remains were moved to the Turkish State Cemetery in Ankara, after the military coup of 1980.

Sources

See also
List of high-ranking commanders of the Turkish War of Independence

1882 births
1968 deaths
People from Üsküdar
People from Constantinople vilayet
Ottoman Military Academy alumni
Ottoman Military College alumni
Ottoman military personnel of the Balkan Wars
Ottoman prisoners of war
Balkan Wars prisoners of war held by Greece
Ottoman military personnel of World War I
Ottoman Army generals
Members of Kuva-yi Milliye
Turkish military personnel of the Greco-Turkish War (1919–1922)
Turkish Army generals
Pashas
20th-century Turkish diplomats
Ambassadors of Turkey to the Soviet Union
Government ministers of Turkey
Speakers of the Parliament of Turkey
Committee of Union and Progress politicians
Progressive Republican Party (Turkey) politicians
Republican People's Party (Turkey) politicians
Democrat Party (Turkey, 1946–1961) politicians
20th-century Turkish politicians
Recipients of the Medal of Independence with Red-Green Ribbon (Turkey)
Ministers of Transport and Communications of Turkey
Deputies of Istanbul
Deputies of Ankara
Deputies of Eskişehir
Deputies of Konya
Ministers of Public Works of Turkey
Ottoman military personnel of the Italo-Turkish War
Members of the 12th government of Turkey
Members of the 13th government of Turkey
Commanders of the Second Army of Turkey
Muhammad Ali dynasty
Turkish people of German descent